Adventurer's Fate is a 1958 Brazilian western film written, directed by, and starring José Mojica Marins. Marins is also known by his alter ego Zé do Caixão (in English, Coffin Joe).

Plot
After running away from a shoot out, the outlaw Jaime falls to the edge of a river, where he is helped by two beautiful young women. He becomes involved romantically with Dorinha, daughter of a farmer and, because of his love for her, kills her father. When escaping the arrest, Jaime has to face Xavier, a bloodthirsty outlaw who plans to avenge the father of Dorinha. Marins appears as Gregorio, a gunman of the flock of Xavier. Marins also wrote the lyrics of the ten songs of the soundtrack. In 1964, the film was relaunched with an extra dose of sex, having included a new scenes with about ten minutes in the brothel.

Cast
 Acácio de Lima
 Alaert Leão
 Amids Martinez
 Augusto de Cervantes
 Enibalú
 Graveto
 José Mojica Marins as Gregorio
 Mário Lima
 Ruth Ferreira
 Shirley Alves
 Tônia Eletra

References

External links 
 Official film site
 
 Sina de Aventureiro on Portal Heco de Cinema

1958 Western (genre) films
1958 films
Brazilian Western (genre) films
Films directed by José Mojica Marins
1950s Portuguese-language films
1958 directorial debut films